Bansko (Банско in Macedonian) is a village in North Macedonia. It is situated in the Strumica Plain, near the Belasica range. It is known for the Bansko spa .

As of the 2021 census, Bansko had 2,414 residents with the following ethnic composition:
Turks 1,142
Macedonians 827 
Persons for whom data are taken from administrative sources 434
Others 11

References

Villages in North Macedonia
Spa towns in North Macedonia